Mian Nisar Gul is a Pakistani politician who had been a member of the Provincial Assembly of Khyber Pakhtunkhwa from March 2008 to March 2013 and August 2018 to January 2023.

Political career

He was elected to the Provincial Assembly of Khyber Pakhtunkhwa as a candidate of Muttahida Majlis-e-Amal from Constituency PK-85 (Karak-I) in 2018 Pakistani general election. Following his successful election, he was named by the opposition parties in the Khyber Pakhtunkhwa Assembly for the office of Chief Minister of Khyber Pakhtunkhwa. On 16 August 2018, he received 33 votes and lost the seat to Mahmood Khan who secured 77 votes.

References

Living people
Muttahida Majlis-e-Amal MPAs (Khyber Pakhtunkhwa)
Year of birth missing (living people)